Alsophilinae is a subfamily of the moth family Geometridae, consisting of two genera, Alsophila and Inurois.

References

 
Geometridae
Moth subfamilies

no:Alsophilinae